Alexander Moore Farm is a historic farm and national historic district located near Catawba, Catawba County, North Carolina. The district encompasses 5 contributing buildings and 1 contributing site. The main house was built in 1843, and is a two-story, frame, vernacular late Federal style farmhouse.  Also on the property are the contributing log wagon shed, smokehouse, frame barn, and log barn.

It was added to the National Register of Historic Places in 1990.

References

Farms on the National Register of Historic Places in North Carolina
Historic districts on the National Register of Historic Places in North Carolina
Federal architecture in North Carolina
Houses completed in 1843
Houses in Catawba County, North Carolina
National Register of Historic Places in Catawba County, North Carolina
1843 establishments in North Carolina